Let's Talk About Love is the second extended play (EP) by Korean singer Seungri, member of Big Bang, on August 19, 2013 it was released as an EP in South Korea, while on October 9 of the same year a Japanese version was released with 14 tracks.

Release and reception
Recording for Seungri's second Korean EP took over two years, where he also involved himself with the production of the album. The EP was released on August 19, 2013, debuting at number one on the Gaon Chart and went on to sell over 70,000 copies. He promoted the singles "Gotta Talk to You" (Korean: 할말 있어요, Revised Romanization: Halmal Isseoyo) and the eponymous title track. In October of the same year, he released his first Japanese album, selling over 14,000 copies in its first day and topping the Oricon Charts. The album contained songs from his previous albums, as well as the new song "The Feelings Painted in the Sky" (Japanese: 空に描く思い), which was later used as the theme song for Seungri's first Japanese television drama Yubikoi ～Kimini Okuru Message～.

The album was well received, Billboard described the album as "showcases Seungri's affinity for high-quality pop and electro-pop jams." and naming "Let's Talk About Love" as one of the stand out tracks of the album, and calling it "one of the most accessible Korean tracks released this year.". All the 6 songs debuted in the Gaon Digital Singles and the Billboard K-Pop Hot 100 charts.

Track listing

Charts

Sales

Release history

See also
Big Bang (South Korean band)
YG Entertainment

References

2013 EPs
YG Entertainment albums
Seungri albums
Korean-language EPs